Dębnica Kaszubska  (formerly ) is a village in Słupsk County, Pomeranian Voivodeship, in northern Poland. It is the seat of the gmina (administrative district) called Gmina Dębnica Kaszubska. It lies at the north-eastern edge of the National Park known as the Park Krajobrazowy Dolina Słupi (the Słupia Valley Landscape Park), on Voivodeship Road 210 and on the  river.

For the history of the region, see History of Pomerania.

The village has a population of 3,220.

References

Villages in Słupsk County